The 2004 United States Olympic trials for swimming events were held from July 7 to 14 in Long Beach, California.  It was the qualifying meet for American swimmers who hoped to compete at the 2004 Summer Olympics in Athens.

Results 
Key:

Men's events

Women's events

See also
United States at the 2004 Summer Olympics
United States Olympic Trials (swimming)
USA Swimming

References

External links
  2004 US Olympic swimming trials results by event at Omegatiming.com
  2004 US Olympic swimming trials report at Usaswimming.org

United States Olympic trials
United States Summer Olympics Trials
Swimming Olympic trials
United States Olympic trials